The 1986–87 NCAA Division III men's ice hockey season began in November 1986 and concluded on March 21 of the following year. This was the 14th season of Division III college ice hockey.

In 1990 the NCAA ruled that Plattsburgh State had violated regulations by allowing some of their players to reside in houses owned by people invested in the ice hockey program and were provided with some measure of benefits including free housing, free meals and cash loans. Because these violations occurred between 1985 and 1988 Plattsburgh State's participation in all NCAA games during that time was vacated. As a result there is no NCAA champion for the 1987 season in Division III ice hockey. This is the only NCAA ice hockey championship to be rescinded (as of 2019).

Regular season

Season tournaments

Standings

Note: Mini-game are not included in final standings

1987 NCAA Tournament

Note: * denotes overtime period(s)Note: † Plattsburgh State's participation in the tournament was later vacated by the NCAA

See also
 1986–87 NCAA Division I men's ice hockey season

References

External links

 
NCAA